Dog Bone Lake is a dog bone-shaped topographic flat with two larger ends connected by a narrow body, which are two of the three eponymic features of their namesake, the Three Lakes Valley, Nevada.

References

Lakes of Nevada
Lakes of Clark County, Nevada
Lakes of Lincoln County, Nevada